Annaliisa Farrell (born 23 January 1966, in Tokanui) is a New Zealand paralympic cyclist and pilot, who won a bronze medal at the 2008 Summer Paralympics along with tandem partner Jayne Parsons in the Women's Time trial.

References

External links 
 
 

1966 births
Living people
New Zealand female cyclists
Paralympic cyclists of New Zealand
Paralympic sighted guides
Paralympic bronze medalists for New Zealand
Paralympic medalists in cycling
Cyclists at the 2008 Summer Paralympics
Medalists at the 2008 Summer Paralympics
Sportspeople from Southland, New Zealand
People from the Catlins